Holy Family RC & CE College (formerly St Joseph's RC High School) is a coeducational secondary school located in Heywood in the English county of Greater Manchester.

It is a voluntary aided school administered by Rochdale Metropolitan Borough Council, the Roman Catholic Diocese of Salford and the Church of England Diocese of Manchester. It was previously known as St Joseph's RC High School serving the Catholic population of the local area, however it became a joint-faith Catholic/Church of England school in 2007 and was renamed Holy Family RC & CE College.

Holy Family RC & CE College offers GCSEs and BTECs as programmes of study for pupils.

References

External links
Holy Family RC & CE College official website

Secondary schools in the Metropolitan Borough of Rochdale
Catholic secondary schools in the Diocese of Salford
Voluntary aided schools in England
Church of England secondary schools in the Diocese of Manchester
Heywood, Greater Manchester